Desulfovibrio desulfuricans is a Gram-negative sulfate-reducing bacteria. It is generally found in soils, waters, and the stools of animals, although in rare cases it has been found to cause infection in humans.<ref>{{cite journal|author1=EJC Goldstein |author2=DM Citron |author3=VA Peraino |author4=SA Cross |title=Desulfovibrio desulfricans Bacteremia and Review of Human Desulfovibrio Infections |journal=J Clin Microbiol |volume=41 |issue=6 |pages=2752–2754 |pmid=12791922 |pmc=156571 |date= June 2003 |doi=10.1128/jcm.41.6.2752-2754.2003}}</ref> It is particularly noted for its ability to produce methyl mercury. Also the 'reductive glycine pathway', a seventh route for organisms to capture , was discovered in this species. Since these bacteria are killed  by exposure to atmospheric oxygen, the environmental niches most frequently  occupied by these bacteria are anaerobic. Desulfovibrio desulfuricans 27774 was reported to produce gene transfer agents

MorphologyDesulfovibrio desulfuricans has been described as a motile, rod-shaped,  Gram-negative obligate anaerobe with polar flagella. It measures approximately 3μm by 0.5μm.

References

External linksD. desulfuricans'' genome from NCBI
Type strain of Desulfovibrio desulfuricans at BacDive -  the Bacterial Diversity Metadatabase

Martinus Beijerinck
Desulfovibrio